Al-Mahfurah is a village in northern Syria located northwest of Homs in the Homs Governorate. Nearby towns include Shin to the southwest, Suwayri to the south, Sharqliyya to the northeast, al-Qabu to the north, Fahel to the northwest and Rabah to the west. According to the Syria Central Bureau of Statistics, al-Mahfurah had a population of 1,845 in the 2004 census. Its inhabitants are predominantly Alawites.

References

Bibliography

 

Populated places in Homs District
Alawite communities in Syria